The 1980–81 NC State Wolfpack men's basketball team represented North Carolina State University during the 1980–81 men's college basketball season. It was Jim Valvano's 1st season as head coach.

Roster

Schedule

|-
!colspan=12 style=| Regular season

|-
!colspan=12 style=| ACC Tournament

Rankings

References

NC State Wolfpack men's basketball seasons
Nc State
NC State Wolfpack men's basketball
NC State Wolfpack men's basketball